Paul Birch may refer to:
 Paul Birch (basketball) (1910–1982), American basketball player and coach
 Paul Birch (actor) (1912–1969), American stage and film actor
 Paul Birch (writer) (1956–2012), British author and astronomer
 Paul Birch (footballer, born 1962) (1962–2009), English football midfielder
 Paul Birch (footballer, born 1968), English football striker
 Paul Hansen Birch (1788–1863), Norwegian general